

Overview

Bien Viet Securities J.S.C. (CBV) ( a former name of Woori CBV Securities Corporation) is Vietnam provider of financial and investment services. CBV has been well known as the first and largest provider of Vietnam’s financial market indexes and economic indicators.
Vietnam Securities Indexes is the first equity index that composes all stocks listed on the two exchanges in Hanoi and Ho Chi Minh City. Vietnam Finance Indexes family is the first family of Vietnam finance indexes to be sponsored and introduced  by Bloomberg to global financial institutions. The index system developed by CBV is the world's largest index family for Vietnam with over 450 equity indexes, 50 fixed income indexes, and over 50 indexes in other categories.

The company's most known indexes include Vietnam Securities Indexes, Vietnam Bond Indexes, Vietnam Investor Confidence Index, VND Index, Vietnam Consumer Confidence Index.

Shareholder

CBV's first major shareholder is Woori Investment & Securities Ltd., whose mother company is Woori Financial Group, the largest financial institution in South Korea.

See also 

Woori CBV Securities Corporation
Vietnam Investor Confidence Index 
VND Index 
Vietnam Consumer Confidence Index
Vietnam Securities Indexes
Vietnam Bond Indexes
Woori Financial Group
Woori Investment & Securities

External links 
Overview of CBV
Website of Bien Viet Securities 
About Vietnam Securities Index
Vietnam Securities Indexes on Website of Vietnam Chamber of Commerce and Industry
Vietnam Securities Indexes on Website of State Bank of Vietnam
Vietnam Securities Indexes Article on SBV
CBV on Vietnamnews
CBV on Vneconomy 1
CBV on Vneconomy 2
CBV on Saga Finance
CBV on Website of Businessweek
CBV on Reuters
Vietnam Finance Indexes Introduction by Bloomberg in Hong Kong and Singapore

References

Investment companies of Vietnam
Financial services companies of Vietnam